SS Alabama was a steamship that served on the Great Lakes.

Construction
Alabama was built by the Manitowoc Shipbuilding Company at Manitowoc, Wisconsin, in 1909.

Owners
Alabama'''s first owner was the Goodrich Transit Company.

In 1946, the Georgian Bay Line sold Alabama'' for conversion to barge service.  She was moved to Detroit's Rouge River where her passenger cabins were removed and her hull renovated for use as a cargo barge to haul scrap metal.

Purchased in 2005 by Dean Construction, she was towed to LaSalle, Ontario, Canada, that October, and was later scrapped.

References

External links
 

1909 ships
Great Lakes ships
Steamships of the United States
Barges of the United States
Manitowoc County, Wisconsin
Passenger ships of the United States
Ships built in Manitowoc, Wisconsin